Below is a List of compositions by Bedřich Smetana sorted by genre, catalogue numbers, original and English titles.  JB numbers are from Tematický katalog skladeb Bedřicha Smetany (Thematic Catalogue of Works by Bedřich Smetana) by Jiří Berkovec (Prague, 1999).  B. numbers are from the catalogue by František Bartoš.  T. numbers are from the 1893 catalogue by Karel Teige.

See also 

 List of operas by Bedřich Smetana

References 
 Festival Smetana Litomyšl
 Classical Archives
 Studio Matouš – Smetana

Compositions by Bedřich Smetana
Smetana, Bedrich
Smetana, Bedrich, List of compositions by